The Grand Street Shuttle was a New York City Subway service that operated during the long Manhattan Bridge rehabilitation project while the north tracks (connecting to the IND Sixth Avenue Line via the Chrystie Street Connection) were closed. It usually ran between Broadway–Lafayette Street and Grand Street, picking up the slack from rerouted or suspended  and  service.

History
Service disruptions that took the Manhattan Bridge north tracks out of service, with the shuttle running between Broadway–Lafayette Street and Grand Street, included the following:

March 12, 1984 and August 10 to November 3, 1985 ( and  cut back to West Fourth Street–Washington Square)

Regular service had been expected to resume on October 26, 1986.

The Sixth Avenue Shuttle (which also ended at Broadway–Lafayette Street) was ended on December 16, 2001 with the rerouting of  trains to the 63rd Street Tunnel and introduction of the  train, and the Grand Street Shuttle was extended north to West Fourth Street–Washington Square. On April 27, 2003, service was decreased to run every 15 minutes instead of every 12 minutes at all times except late nights. The rehabilitation was finished on February 22, 2004, and the shuttle was discontinued. Also during this time, a shuttle bus ran between Canal Street and Grand Street.

Final route

References

External links
3 Months Ago, Residents of Queens Were Mad as Hell. Guess What, Brooklyn, Bronx and Manhattan?, MTA service notice, 1985
Grand Street Shuttle Timetable (2003)

Defunct New York City Subway services
Grand Street (Manhattan)